Pedro de Arbués, also known as Peter of Arbués (c. 1441 – 17 September 1485) was a Spanish Roman Catholic priest and a professed Augustinian canon. He served as an official of the Spanish Inquisition until he was assassinated in the La Seo Cathedral in Zaragoza in 1485 by Jews and conversos. The veneration of him came swiftly through popular acclaim. His death greatly assisted the Inquisitor-General Tomás de Torquemada's campaign against heretics and crypto-Jews. His canonization was celebrated on 29 June 1867.

Life
Pedro de Arbués was born at Épila in the region of Zaragoza to the nobleman Antonio de Arbués and Sancia Ruiz.

He studied philosophy perhaps in Huesca but later travelled to Bologna on a scholarship to the Spanish College of Saint Clement which was part of the Bologna college. He obtained his doctorate in 1473 while he served as a professor of moral philosophical studies or ethics. Upon his return to Spain he became a member of the cathedral chapter of the canons regular at La Seo where he made his religious profession in 1474.

At around that time Ferdinand and Isabella had obtained from Pope Sixtus IV a papal bull to establish in their kingdom a tribunal for searching out heretics, the Inquisition had been first established in Spain in Aragón, 14th century, to counteract the Catharism heresy. Those Jews who had received baptism were known as conversos; some might have continued to practice Judaism in secret, called 'judaizantes'. Tomás de Torquemada, a Marrano surname, was in 1483 appointed as the Grand Inquisitor for Castile. Espina, confessor of Isabella, was formerly a rabin. Torquemada then appointed Arbués and Pedro Gaspar Juglar as Inquisitors Provincial in the Kingdom of Aragon on 4 May 1484. Their work was opposed by converts and people who saw it as a threat to their freedoms.

On 14 September 1485 Pedro was attacked in the cathedral as he knelt before the altar and had been wearing armour since he knew his work posed great risks. Despite wearing a helmet and chain mail under the tunic he died from his wounds on 17 September. His remains were entombed in a special chapel dedicated to him. 

The Inquisition was unpopular in Aragon as it was seen as a Castilian attack on the charters, privileges and local laws. The most powerful families among the converted Jews: the Sánchez, Montesa, Abadía (AbdYah), Paterno and Santangel families seem to have been involved in funding the murder.

As a result, a popular movement against the Jews arose in which nine were executed, two killed themselves, thirteen were burnt in effigy, and four punished for complicity, from 30 June to 15 December 1486, according to the historian Jerónimo Zurita. Leonardo Sciascia in Morte dell'inquisitore (1964) writes that Arbués along with Juan Lopez Cisneros (d. 1657) are "the only two cases of inquisitors who died assassinated".

Sainthood
 
Pope Alexander VII beatified Pedro de Arbués in Rome on 20 April 1664. His canonization was celebrated on 29 June 1867 among protests from Jews and Christians. Pope Pius IX said in the document formalizing the canonization (Maiorem caritatem): "The divine wisdom has arranged that in these sad days, when Jews help the enemies of the church with their books and money, this decree of sanctity has been brought to fulfillment".

Notes and references

Further reading
 Simon Whitechapel, Flesh Inferno: Atrocities of Torquemada and the Spanish Inquisition (Creation Books, 2003). 
 
 Pedro Arbues in the public domain Jewish Encyclopedia, Funk and Wagnalls, 1901 - 1906.

External links

 
 Saints SQPN
 Encyclopedia.com

1440s births
1485 deaths
15th-century Christian saints
15th-century Aragonese Roman Catholic priests
15th-century Roman Catholic martyrs
Canonizations by Pope Pius IX
Burials at the Cathedral of the Savior of Zaragoza
Canonical Augustinian saints
Inquisitors
Martyred Roman Catholic priests
Clergy from Zaragoza
Spanish Roman Catholic saints
University of Bologna alumni
Beatifications by Pope Alexander VII